Music for 'Bubble' is an album by Robert Pollard, released in 2005. It collects his score for the Steven Soderbergh film Bubble.

Track listing
All songs written by Robert Pollard
 "All Men Are Freezing" – 2:14
 "747 Ego" – 2:07
 "Boring About – 1:51
 "Search-light Pickups" – 1:28
 "I'm No Child" – 2:02
 "747 Ego (Oh Yeah)" – 2:07

2005 EPs
Robert Pollard albums
2005 soundtrack albums
Drama film soundtracks